The Second Battle of Brega was a battle during the Libyan Civil War. More than 10 days earlier, anti-Gaddafi forces beat back an attempt by loyalist forces to take the town on 2 March 2011, in the First Battle of Brega. Following that battle, rebel forces advanced along the Libyan Coastal Highway, taking the towns of Ra's Lanuf and Bin Jawad. However, after the Battle of Bin Jawad and the Battle of Ra's Lanuf, government troops retook all of the territory lost and were once again threatening Brega by mid-March.

The battle
On 13 March, regime's forces, advancing from Ra's Lanuf, succeeded in retaking Brega, though that night reports indicated that fighting was still ongoing and rebels possibly still controlled portions of the town. Reportedly, the rebels re-entered the town and heavy fighting ensued, after which government troops retreated to Brega's airport. However, just an hour later, it was stated that loyalist forces had pushed back rebel troops from the town to aj-Ojela, 20 kilometers east of Brega.

By the morning of 14 March, rebel forces were holding the residential district and loyalist forces were holding the oil facilities.

On 15 March, rebel forces had abandoned Brega and were in full retreat towards Ajdabiya. Ajdabiya itself came under ground attack just a few hours later, marking the beginning of the Battle of Ajdabiya.

Aftermath

On 26 March, after loyalists lost Ajdabiya and retreated further down the coast, rebel forces recaptured Brega. A few days later, loyalist troops returned again, recapturing the city after a prolonged battle with rebel forces.

References

Battles of the First Libyan Civil War
Conflicts in 2011
March 2011 events in Africa
Battles in 2011